Thomas Francis Elmitt (24 January 1871 – 25 February 1938) was a Canadian sports shooter. He competed in the 1000 yard free rifle event at the 1908 Summer Olympics.

References

1871 births
1938 deaths
Canadian male sport shooters
Olympic shooters of Canada
Shooters at the 1908 Summer Olympics
Sportspeople from Ottawa